Lygephila amasina is a moth of the family Erebidae first described by Otto Staudinger in 1878. It is found in Turkey, Lebanon and Israel.

Adults can be distinguished from similar Lygephila lusoria lusoria by the more contrasting wing pattern and the somewhat longer inner corner of the reniform stigmata.

References

External links

"08927a Lygephila amasina (Staudinger, 1877)". Lepiforum e.V. Retrieved December 6, 2019. 

Moths described in 1878
Toxocampina
Moths of Europe
Taxa named by Otto Staudinger